The SZD-45 Ogar (Hound) is a T-tailed cantilever high-wing monoplane of wooden, aluminium and fibreglass construction designed and manufactured in Poland.

Design and development
Designed bu Dipl.-Ing. Tadeusz Labuc, the 2-seat Ogar is intended for training glider pilots from ab-initio to advanced stages as well as cross-country flying. The first prototype,(reg. no. SP-0001), first flew on 29 May 1973 powered by a  Stark-Stamo engine. Due to the Stamo engine being unavailable, production SZD-45A Ogars were built with  Limbach SL1700EC engines and later with Franklin 2A-120 engines as the SZD-45-2 Ogar F.

Of pod and boom layout the Ogar has a T-tail on a tubular Aluminium alloy tubular boom extending from the keel of the fuselage pod, which houses the cockpit and engine. A variety of materials are used in construction, with a glass-fibre cockpit shell over two load-bearing wooden frames. The wings are of wooden single-spar construction skinned with plywood and covered with glass-fibre. The engine is mounted at the rear of the fuselage pod, aft of the wing trailing edge at the same level and driving a pusher propeller. The undercarriage consists of a semi-retractable mainwheel fitted with a disc brake, steerable tailwheel and optional outrigger wheels on flexible struts at the wing-tips. Accommodation for two pilots is provided side by side under an aft-hinged upward-opening canopy. The Ogar was certified for simple aerobatics.

Of the 66 production aircraft, 41 were exported;those destined for the United States were powered by dual-ignition, turbocharged, Revmaster/Volkswagen VW 2962 engines.

Variants
SZD-45 Ogar The prototype powered by a  Stark-Stamo engine.
SZD-45A OgarInitial production variant powered by a  Limbach SL1700EC engines.
SZD-45-2 Ogar FLater production aircraft powered bya  Franklin 2A-120A (later 2A-120CP) 2-cyl air-cooled horizontally opposed piston engine.

Specifications (SZD-45A Ogar)

Notes

References

External links

Hanover Show Review 1976

Motor gliders
1970s Polish sailplanes
PZL aircraft
T-tail aircraft
Single-engined pusher aircraft
High-wing aircraft
SZD aircraft
Aircraft first flown in 1973